Kothapalem or Akurajupalli is a village situated in the Machavaram mandal (sub-division) of the Guntur district, Andhra Pradesh, India

Geography 

References

External links 
 Kothapalem

Villages in Guntur district